Bruno Joannes Tideman (1834-1883) was a naval engineer in the Netherlands,  who acted as consultant to the ship building industry. In 1873 he designed a new type of engine that enable ships to gain significant speed, which at the time was considered a revolutionary innovation.

A descendant, also Bruno Tideman, founded a new boatbuilding company Tideman Boats in 2006. Tideman boats builds high-speed workboats out of HDPE.

References

Further reading

External links
Posthumous portrait of Tideman

1834 births
1883 deaths
19th-century Dutch engineers